Law enforcement rights in Western Sahara, a disputed territory, is covered in the following articles:
Law enforcement in Morocco — Morocco controls 80 percent of Western Sahara
Law enforcement in the Sahrawi Arab Democratic Republic — controls remainder of territory

Western Sahara
Western Sahara